Chris Del Conte (born June 19, 1968) is vice president and Athletics Director at the University of Texas at Austin, a position he has served in since 2017.

Personal life 
Del Conte is a graduate of the University of California, Santa Barbara, where he was a student-athlete in track and field and received a Bachelor of Arts degree in sociology. He also holds a master's degree in education, administration and supervision from Washington State University.

Del Conte is married to Robin Ward and has two daughters, Sienna and Sophia.

References 

Living people
1968 births
Texas Longhorns athletic directors
UC Santa Barbara Gauchos men's track and field athletes
Washington State University alumni
Athletic directors